The pitch bearing, also named blade bearing, is a component of modern wind turbines which connect the rotor hub and the rotor blade. The bearing allows the required oscillation to control the loads and power of the wind turbine. The pitch system brings the blade to the desired position by adapting the aerodynamic angle of attack. The pitch system is also used for emergency breaks of the turbine system.

Design 

Mostly large rolling element bearing are used as pitch bearings. The bearing is subjected to high bending moments, radial and axial loads in both directions. Therefore, the rolling elements for state of the art wind turbines are ball bearings, which are used in a double rowed four-point contact. This means each raceway carries on two points, and in sum four points are carrying. Other possible options are different arrangements of the rolling elements or multirow cylindrical roller bearings. Pitch bearing of modern wind turbines can reach diameters of more than 4 meters.

Change of the lubricants can be carried out only with great time and cost expenditure. Furthermore, due to the constant rotation of the hub, the used lubricant must remain in place. Therefore, the pitch bearings in wind turbines are usually lubricated with grease. The bearing experiences a wide range of operating conditions during operation. Therefore, the operating conditions are very difficult for greases over the entire turbine time. The industrial greases that have been used so far have very different compositions and do not always lead to the desired result of preventing wear.

Load situation 

The load and operating situation of pitch bearings are for rolling element bearings comparatively unfavorable. The bearings are exposed to high loads and small reciprocating movements created by the pitch system or vibrations from the wind profile. The small reciprocating movements between rolling elements and raceway can lead to wear phenomena like false brinelling and fretting corrosion. Furthermore, the high loads can lead to truncation of the contact ellipse. Due to the small reciprocating movements calculation methods to estimate the bearing service life and the friction torque are not usable for pitch bearings. Newer controlling concepts of pitch control, like individual pitch control, will lead to a different operating behavior which in worst could favor false brinelling and fretting corrosion  or in best case reduce such wear.

References

Bearings (mechanical)
Wind turbines